Manipuri dances may refer to:

 Jagois, the dance forms of the culture of Meitei people, the predominant ethnic group of Manipur
 Dances of Manipur